The 2010 Paris–Tours was the 104th edition of this single day road bicycle racing event and is organized by the Amaury Sport Organisation (ASO), which also runs the Tour de France. Óscar Freire won the Ruban Jaune as he broke the record for the fastest average speed in a professional cycling race or stage longer than 200 km in 2010 Paris–Tours.

General standings

2010-10-10: La Loupe–Tours, 233 km

References

Paris
Paris–Tours
Paris-Tours
Paris-Tours